John Patrick Dolan (born June 8, 1962) is an American prelate of the Catholic Church who has served as bishop in the Diocese of Phoenix since August 2022.

Early life 
Dolan was born June 8, 1962, in San Diego, California, to Catherine and Gerald Dolan, the seventh of nine children. Dolan attended the School of the Madeleine at St. Mary Magdalene Parish in San Diego and graduated from the University of San Diego High School in 1981. He then enrolled in St. Francis Seminary, a house of formation on the University of San Diego (USD) campus.

After receiving a Bachelor of Philosophy degree in 1985, he entered Saint Patrick's Seminary and University in Menlo Park, California. He obtained his Master of Divinity and Master of Theology degrees in 1989.

Career

Priesthood 
On July 1, 1989, Dolan was ordained a priest for the Diocese of San Diego by Bishop Leo Maher. 

He was assistant pastor of Saint Michael Parish in San Diego from 1989 to 1991 and of Santa Sophia Parish in Spring Valley from 1991 to 1992). He was pastor of Saint Mary Star of the Sea Parish in Oceanside from 1996 to 2001; Saint Michael Parish in San Diego from 2001 to 2002; Saint Rose of Lima Parish in Chula Vista from 2002 to 2014; Saint Michael Parish in Poway from 2014 to 2016; and Saint John Parish in San Diego from 2016 to 2017.

He became the diocesan episcopal vicar for the clergy in 2016.

Auxiliary Bishop of San Diego 
On April 19, 2017, Pope Francis appointed Dolan auxiliary bishop for the Diocese of San Diego and titular bishop of Uchi Maius. On June 8, 2017, he was consecrated a bishop by Bishop Robert W. McElroy. He continued to serve as vicar for clergy until 2022 and was moderator of the curia from 2017 to 2022.

Bishop of Phoenix 

On June 10, 2022, Pope Francis appointed Dolan bishop of the Diocese of Phoenix. Dolan was installed on August 2, 2022.

Within the United States Conference of Catholic Bishops, Dolan is a member of the Committee on Migration and the Committee for the Protection of Children and Young People.

See also

 Catholic Church hierarchy
 Catholic Church in the United States
 Historical list of the Catholic bishops of the United States
 List of Catholic bishops of the United States
 Lists of patriarchs, archbishops, and bishops

References

External links
Roman Catholic Diocese of Phoenix official website 
Roman Catholic Diocese of San Diego official website
Bishop John Patrick Dolan (Catholic-Hierarchy.org; David P. Cheney)
Christ in our Neighborhood

 

1962 births
Living people
21st-century Roman Catholic bishops in the United States
Roman Catholic bishops in California
Roman Catholic Diocese of San Diego
Bishops appointed by Pope Francis